Fugloyarfjørður is the firth separating Svínoy from Fugloy in the Faroe Islands.

References

 

Bodies of water of the Faroe Islands
Straits of the Faroe Islands